Al-Qitaa, also known as Al-Majawdeh, is a Syrian town located in Abu Kamal District, Deir ez-Zor.  According to the Syria Central Bureau of Statistics (CBS), Al-Qitaa had a population of 8,251 in the 2004 census.

References 

Populated places in Deir ez-Zor Governorate
Populated places on the Euphrates River